Roissy-en-Brie is a French railway station in Roissy-en-Brie, in the Seine-et-Marne department in the Île-de-France region. It is served by RER E.

Location 
The station is at kilometric point 29.880 of the Paris-Est–Mulhouse-Ville railway. Its altitude is 109 m.

History 
The Chemins de fer de l'Est company put into service Roissy-en-Brie station on 9 February 1857, as the section from Nogent–Le Perreux to Nangis opens to commercial service. That section opens with a single track; the second one is put into service on 23 April. The next section, from Nangis to Flamboin, opens on 25 April 1857.

In 2000, a contract between the State and the Île-de-France region organised the expansion of RER E from Villiers-sur-Marne–Le Plessis-Trévise to Tournan. On 14 February 2002, the STIF board of directors approves of the pilot. On 14 December 2003, the line is cut from its historical network to Paris-Est, and linked with RER E leading to Haussmann–Saint Lazare underground station. That integration modify journeys and timetables, and improves the station services. Platforms are raised from 0.55 metres (1.80 ft) to 0.92 metres (3.02 ft) to facilitate access to the carriages. Facilities improve accessibility to people with limited mobility. Screens on the platforms show real time information.

Service

Facilities 
As a Transilien network station, commercial services are available everyday, as well as facilities and assistance to people with limited mobility. The station is equipped with vending machines for Transilien and main lines tickets, and with real time traffic information system. A tobacco shop and several facilities are present, such as a photo booth and a vending machine proposing drinks and sweets.

A car park and a bike park are set next to the station.

Train service 
Roissy-en-Brie is served by RER E trains in both directions by one train every 30 minutes off-peak and in the evening. It is served by two to four trains an hour during peak times.

Connections 
The station is served by Sit'bus lines 501A, A, D and E, and by Noctilien night line N142.

References

External links 
 

Réseau Express Régional stations
Railway stations in Seine-et-Marne
Railway stations in France opened in 1857